The Queensland Reds Women, or Queensland Reds (Super W), are an Australian women's rugby union team based in Brisbane, Queensland that compete in the annual Super W competition. A female rugby union competition, is considered to be the female equivalent of the Super Rugby, however only holds Australian teams (until 2022). New Zealand holds a similar competition, the Super Rugby Aupiki.

Founded in 2017, prior to the first Super W season, the team has played in every edition, and has been one of the most competitive in the competition.

Current squad
On 9 February 2022, the squad for the 2022 season was announced.

Season standings

Notes

References

2017 establishments in Australia
Rugby clubs established in 2017
Women's rugby union teams in Australia
Super W
Rugby union teams in Queensland
Sporting clubs in Brisbane
Queensland Reds